There are at least 78 named lakes and reservoirs in Desha County, Arkansas.

Lakes

 Alligator Lake, el. 
 Amos Bayou, el. 
 Austin Brake, el. 
 Bar Lake, el. 
 Bar Lake, el. 
 Bear Lake, el. 
 Bear Lake (historical), el. 
 Belcoe Lake, el. 
 Big Round Lake, el. 
 Billy Moore Lake, el. 
 Blue Hole, el. 
 Blue Hole, el. 
 Blue Hole, el. 
 Blue Hole, el. 
 Bobs Blue Hole, el. 
 Bobtail Lake, el. 
 Callie Lake, el. 
	Clear Lake, el. 
	Deep Lake, el. 
	Double Cabin Lake, el. 
	Dry Bayou, el. 
	Eagles Nest Lake, el. 
	East Moon Lake, el. 
	Echubby Lake, el. 
	Elbow Lakes, el. 
	Fishing Bayou Waterhole, el. 
	Graddy Blue Hole, el. 
	Grindle Hole, el. 
	Half Moon Lake, el. 
	Hog Pen Hole, el. 
	Hole in the Wall Lake, el. 
	Jefferson Lake, el. 
	Kate Adams Lake, el. 
	Lake Beulah, el. 
	Lake Cheatham, el. 
	Lake Defiance, el. 
	Lake Isaacs, el. 
	Lake Lenox, el. 
	Lake Lenox, el. 
	Lake Whittington, el. 
	Little Clear Lake, el. 
	Little Goose Lake, el. 
	Little Jefferson Lake, el. 
	Long Lake, el. 
	Long Lake, el. 
	Lower Parish Lake, el. 
	Lower Swan Lake, el. 
	Lower Taylor Lake, el. 
	Minnie Anderson Old River, el. 
	Mixture Lake, el. 
	Moon Lake, el. 
	Mossy Lake, el. 
	Mound Lake, el. 
	Mud Lake, el. 
	Old River Lake, el. 
	Oxbow Lake, el. 
	Oxbow Lake, el. 
	Ozark Lake, el. 
	Paradise Bayou, el. 
	Parish Lake, el. 
	Pelican Lake (Arkansas), el. 
	Pothole Lake, el. 
	Prairie Lakes, el. 
	Prices Lake, el. 
	Red Fork Lake, el. 
	Silver Lake, el. 
	Smith Lake, el. 
	Swan Lake, el. 
	Swan Lake, el. 
	Swan Lake, el. 
	Swan Lake, el. 
	Timber Lake, el. 
	Upper Old River Lake, el. 
	Walnut Lake, el. 
	Webfoot Lake, el. 
	Whisky Lake, el. 
	Whitehill Lake, el.

Reservoir
 Frenchie Lake, el.

See also

 List of lakes in Arkansas

Notes

Bodies of water of Desha County, Arkansas
Desha